The Malagasy mouse-eared bat (Myotis goudotii) is a species of bat in the family Vespertilionidae that is endemic to Madagascar.

Sources

Mammals described in 1834
Endemic fauna of Madagascar
Mammals of Madagascar
Mouse-eared bats
Taxonomy articles created by Polbot
Taxa named by Andrew Smith (zoologist)
Bats of Africa
Taxobox binomials not recognized by IUCN